Éder Saúl López is a Mexican actor, stunt man, and model. He started his career as an actor in several telenovelas. He has also appeared in several commercials for companies like Jack in the Box and Carl's Jr. for Spanish speaking channels like Univision.

Filmography

References 

Living people
Mexican male television actors
Mexican male film actors
21st-century Mexican male actors
Year of birth missing (living people)